Miyazawa is a Japanese surname. Notable people with the surname include:

Emma Miyazawa (born 1988), Japanese actress
, Japanese women's footballer
Kazufumi Miyazawa (born 1966), Japanese musician
Kenji Miyazawa (1896–1933), Japanese poet and author of children's literature
Kiichi Miyazawa (1919–2007), 78th Prime Minister of Japan
Pablo Miyazawa, Brazilian journalist
Rie Miyazawa (born 1973), actress and singer
Sae Miyazawa (born 1990), former Japanese idol  and former member of Japanese girl group AKB48
Takashi Miyazawa (born 1978), Japanese professional cyclist
Takeshi Miyazawa (born 1978), Canadian comic book artist
, Japanese women's basketball player

Fictional characters
Yukino Miyazawa, the female protagonist of the anime and manga series Kare Kano
Yukine Miyazawa, a character in the visual novel Clannad

Japanese-language surnames